Germany was represented by the band Wind, with the song "Laß die Sonne in dein Herz", at the 1987 Eurovision Song Contest, which took place on 9 May in Brussels. "Laß die Sonne in dein Herz" was the winner of the German national final, held on 26 March. This was the second of three appearances by Wind at Eurovision; they had previously finished second for Germany in 1985 and would return to the contest in 1992.

Before Eurovision

Ein Lied für Brüssel 
The final took place on 26 March 1987 at the Frankenhalle in Nuremberg, hosted by Christopher Deumling. Twelve acts presented their entries live and the winner was selected by a panel of approximately 500 people who had been selected as providing a representative cross-section of the German public. 

Other participants included the following year's German entrants Maxi and Chris Garden, and Michael Hoffmann, who had represented Germany in 1983 as half of Hoffmann & Hoffmann with brother Günter (who had committed suicide in 1984).

At Eurovision 
On the night of the final Wind performed 16th in the running order, following France and preceding Cyprus. At the close of voting "Laß die Sonne in dein Herz" had received 141 points, placing Germany second of the 22 entries. Only Greece failed to award any points at all to the song. The 1987 result was very clear-cut, with Germany finishing 31 points behind contest winners Ireland and 38 points ahead of third-placed Italy. The German jury awarded its 12 points to Italy.

Wind became the first act, and to date still the only one, to have finished in second place twice at Eurovision.

Voting

References 

1987
Countries in the Eurovision Song Contest 1987
Eurovision